Perry County Airport  is a public use airport located two nautical miles (4 km) south of the central business district of New Lexington, in Perry County, Ohio, United States. It is owned by the Perry County Airport Authority. This airport is included in the National Plan of Integrated Airport Systems for 2011–2015, which categorized it as a general aviation facility.

Facilities and aircraft 
Perry County Airport covers an area of 53 acres (21 ha) at an elevation of 1,051 feet (320 m) above mean sea level. It has one runway designated 8/26 with an asphalt surface measuring 3,498 by 75 feet (1,066 x 23 m).

For the 12-month period ending June 15, 2012, the airport had 4,550 aircraft operations, an average of 12 per day: 99% general aviation and 1% military. At that time there were 8 aircraft based at this airport: 62.5% single-engine, 12.5% multi-engine, 12.5% jet, and 12.5% ultralight.

References

External links 
 Perry County Airport 
 Aerial image as of April 1994 from USGS The National Map
 

Airports in Ohio
Transportation in Perry County, Ohio